The flag of Flevoland was adopted on January 9, 1986.

Description
The aspect ratio of the flag is 2:3.  

The flag is tierced in fess azure, or and vert.  

The flag recalls how the new province was reclaimed from the IJsselmeer. The central yellow stripe, wavy then straight, symbolises the transformation of the sea into land. Its colour symbolises rapeseed, planted to stabilise the land. The blue represents water, the green the land.

The white fleur-de-lys (lily) is a pun, known in heraldry as canting arms. It commemorates Cornelis Lely, designer of the original polders, essential to the province. The flag of Lelystad, the provincial capital, is decorated with the same flower.

Notes

Flag
Flags of the Netherlands
Flevoland